Senator Rohrbach may refer to:

Eric Rohrbach (born 1950s), Washington State Senate
Larry Rohrbach (born 1946), Missouri State Senate